The 2018 Touring Car Masters was an Australian motor racing series for Touring Cars manufactured between 1 January 1963 and 31 December 1978, IROC Porsche automobiles and Trans Am Class automobiles. It was the twelfth annual Touring Car Masters series. Each car competing in the series was allocated into one the following classes: Pro Masters, Pro Am, Pro Sport, IROC (Porsche), Trans Am.

The series was won by Steve Johnson driving a Ford Mustang.

Teams and drivers 

The following teams and drivers contested the 2018 Touring Car Masters.

Calendar

Series standings

Class winners
 The ProMaster class was won by Steve Johnson
 The ProAm class was won by Cameron Tilley
 The ProSports class was won by Jim Pollicina

References

Touring Car Masters
Touring Car Masters